William Joseph Keough (October 30, 1913 – March 3, 1971) was a labour organizer, journalist and politician in Newfoundland. He represented St. George's-Port au Port in the Newfoundland House of Assembly from 1949 to 1956 and St. George's from 1956 to 1971.

The son of Joseph Patrick Keough and Mary Ellen King, he was born in St. John's and was educated at St. Patrick's Hall and Saint Bonaventure's College. He was active in the co-op movement in Newfoundland and was editor of The Labour Hearlad. In 1942. he married Gertrude Clara O'Brien; the couple had three children.

Keough represented St. George's at the Newfoundland National Convention in 1946 and was part of the delegation sent to England to discuss Newfoundland's future. He served as Minister of Natural Resources in the interim government led by Joey Smallwood. He was elected to the Newfoundland assembly in 1949 and served in the provincial cabinet as Minister of Fisheries and Cooperatives, then as Minister of Mines and Resources and finally as Minister of Labour.

References

External links 
 

1913 births
1971 deaths
Newfoundland National Convention members
Members of the Executive Council of Newfoundland and Labrador
Liberal Party of Newfoundland and Labrador MHAs